Edward William Gnehm Jr. (born November 10, 1944), also known as Skip Gnehm, is an American diplomat who most recently served as the U.S. ambassador to Jordan. He is now a faculty member at George Washington University's Elliott School of International Affairs.

Education
Gnehm attended Albany High School and subsequently attended the George Washington University in Washington, D.C., where he earned a bachelor's degree in International Affairs in 1966. Gnehm completed his master's degree in 1968, and spent one year of his graduate studies at the American University in Cairo under a post-graduate Rotary International Fellowship. He is a member of the Sigma Chi fraternity and Delta Phi Epsilon (The National Professional Foreign Service Fraternity).

Government service
Gnehm joined the U.S. Department of State in 1969 and has forged a long and distinguished diplomatic career in the U.S. Foreign Service. His positions included: Director General of the Foreign Service and Director of Personnel for the Department of State; Deputy Permanent Representative of the United States to the United Nations; Deputy Assistant Secretary of State, Bureau of Near East and South Asian Affairs; Deputy Assistant Secretary of Defense for Near East and South Asia; Deputy Chief of Mission, American Embassy, Amman, Jordan, and Embassy Sanaa, Yemen; head of the U.S. Liaison Office, Riyadh, Saudi Arabia; and Deputy Principal Officer, U.S. Interests Section, Damascus, Syria.

He was Ambassador to Kuwait from 1991 to 1994; Ambassador to Australia from 2000 to 2001; and Ambassador to Jordan from 2001 to 2004.

George Washington University
Throughout his career, Gnehm has remained active at George Washington, having served both on the Board of Trustees, and as the vice president of the George Washington Alumni Association. Gnehm won the 2015 Harry Harding Teaching Award "for sustained excellence in teaching and extraordinary contributions to the education of Elliott School students."  Continuing in the family tradition, Gnehm's son Edward attended George Washington University where he received his BA and an MBA.

Awards
 1990 – Presidential Meritorious Service Award for public service as Assistant Secretary of Defense
 1991 – Presidential Meritorious Service Award for service as Deputy Assistant Secretary of State
 1992 – Distinguished Alumni Achievement Award, The George Washington University
 Secretary of Defense Medal for Meritorious Civilian Service – awarded by Secretary of Defense Carlucci for service in the office of the Secretary of Defense
Secretary of Defense Medal for Meritorious Civilian Service – awarded by Secretary of Defense Perry for support to U.S. forces during and after Desert Storm.

Personal life
Gnehm is married to the former Margaret Scott of Macon, Georgia; together they have two children, Cheryl and Edward III.

Affiliations 

 Member of the board of directors of the Arab Gulf States Institute in Washington

References

External links
Edward Gnehm profile provided by The George Washington University
Edward Gnehm speaker profile provided by The Camden Conference 2005
 Nomination of Edward William Gnehm, Jr., To Be United States Ambassador to Kuwait (June 19, 1990)
 President Clinton Names Edward William Gnehm, Jr. as U.S. Ambassador to Australia (February 10, 2000)

1944 births
Living people
Ambassadors of the United States to Kuwait
Ambassadors of the United States to Australia
Ambassadors of the United States to Jordan
People from Albany, Georgia
Elliott School of International Affairs faculty
Elliott School of International Affairs alumni
George Washington University faculty
People from Carrollton, Georgia
United States Foreign Service personnel
Directors General of the United States Foreign Service